Myrat Hamraýew (born 14 May 1983) is a Turkmen footballer who plays for Turkmen club FC Ahal. He was part of the Turkmenistan national team from 2004.

Club career
In 2013 with FC Balkan he won the 2013 AFC President's Cup in Malaysia.

In 2015, he moved to the FC Ahal.

References

External links
 

Turkmenistan footballers
Turkmenistan international footballers
Expatriate footballers in Azerbaijan
1983 births
Living people
Association football defenders
Turkmenistan expatriate footballers
FC Ahal players
FC Nisa Aşgabat players
Navbahor Namangan players
FK Dinamo Samarqand players
FC AGMK players
FK Karvan players